Andrea Marie Jenkyns (born 16 June 1974) is a British politician serving as Deputy Chairwoman of the European Research Group (ERG) since 2019. She was first elected as the Conservative Member of Parliament for Morley and Outwood in West Yorkshire at the 2015 general election, defeating Shadow Chancellor Ed Balls. She was an advocate for the Eurosceptic organisation Leave Means Leave. She was a strong critic of Theresa May during her leadership of the Conservative Party due to her handling of Brexit. Jenkyns served as Parliamentary Under-Secretary of State for Skills from July to October 2022, when she was sacked by new Prime Minister Rishi Sunak.

Early life and career
Jenkyns was born in Beverley, Humberside. After leaving school at 16, she worked at Greggs bakery. When she was 18, Jenkyns' father sent her photo off to a beauty pageant and she got into the final for Miss UK. Her employment history has included being a music tutor in a secondary school and an executive with a management training company. In her late thirties, Jenkyns studied for a degree in Economics from the Open University and for one in International Relations from the University of Lincoln.

She is a former Lincolnshire County Councillor for Boston North West, having defeated the British National Party in a closely run election winning by only 14 votes. Having won the seat in 2009, she lost it to the UK Independence Party (UKIP) candidate at the following council elections in 2013.

Parliamentary career
Following an open primary in 2013, Jenkyns was selected to contest the Morley and Outwood parliamentary seat as the Conservative candidate. In the 2015 general election, she was elected with a slim majority of 422 votes, unseating Shadow Chancellor of the Exchequer Ed Balls in the process. From July 2015, she sat on the Health Select Committee.

Jenkyns supported Brexit in the 2016 EU membership referendum and was a member of the Exiting the European Union Select Committee from 2016 to 2019. Jenkyns stated that she was willing to vote against the Government if it brought forward to the House of Commons the Chequers proposals on Brexit.

In the 2017 general election, Jenkyns increased her vote share by 11.8%, though only increased her majority to 2,104 as Labour's vote share also increased. Both were helped by the lack of a UKIP candidate in her constituency.

Jenkyns is a Trustee and the Regional Representative (Voluntary) for the charity MRSA Action UK, having joined following the death of her father from the superbug MRSA.

In May 2018, Jenkyns quit her role as a PPS in the Ministry of Housing, Communities and Local Government in order to focus on fighting for Brexit.

In July 2018, after David Davis resigned from the Cabinet, Jenkyns called for the Prime Minister Theresa May to be replaced, saying: "Theresa May's premiership is over." She called on the Prime Minister to return to her Lancaster House speech, stating "Prime Ministers keep their jobs when they keep their promises".

She submitted a formal letter to the 1922 Committee requesting a vote of confidence in Theresa May as leader of the Conservative Party; letters from 48 MPs were at that time required to trigger a vote of confidence. Following this, Iain Dale put Andrea Jenkyns on his Top 100 Most Influential Conservatives of 2018 List, that he produces annually.

Jenkyns gained media attention in January 2019 by erroneously stating that Kenya exports flowers to the EU under WTO terms. In May 2019, Jenkyns received further media attention for her appearance on the BBC's Politics Live show, as she was unable to name any countries that trade solely with the EU using World Trade Organization (WTO) terms.
In 2019, Jenkyns received a campaign donation declared (by Jenkyns) at £2,000 from the Brexit advocate and Leave.EU funder Arron Banks. Banks was barred from membership of the Conservative Party at the time, on the grounds that he had advocated entryism.
Jenkyns has received a number of death threats, largely as a result of her stance on Brexit. In October 2019 she discovered graffiti on the wall of her office calling for her to kill herself. In the summer of 2019, a person was taken to court for threatening to "rip" her face off. In 2018, she received a threatening and sexually explicit email calling for her to be cut with barbed wire and die.

Jenkyns is opposed to Britain's sugary drink tax, arguing instead for "better education, better labelling [and] parental responsibility".

Jenkyns held her seat at the 2019 general election with an increased majority. Jenkyns experienced a considerable amount of abuse and intimidation during the campaign. After the election, she was elected Vice-Chair of the European Research Group, replacing Steve Baker, who became the Chair.

In February 2020, Jenkyns defended her decision to provide a character reference for the court case of a Conservative Party activist who made violent threats to Labour MP Yvette Cooper and was subsequently jailed for nine weeks. The statement described the activist as a "decent and honest person whose heart is in the right place". Jenkyns said that the activist had mental health issues and she wanted his emotional and mental well-being to be taken into consideration as part of the judicial process.

On 17 September 2021, Jenkyns was appointed an Assistant Government Whip in the second cabinet reshuffle of the second Johnson ministry.

In July 2022, Jenkyns was appointed Parliamentary Under-Secretary of State at the Department for Education. On the way to attending Boris Johnson’s resignation speech in Downing Street, Jenkyns was filmed making a "middle finger" gesture at protesters. Jenkyns said she made the gesture after being provoked by a "baying mob", stating she had received "huge amounts of abuse from some of the people who were there over the years". She said she should have shown more composure "but is only human". Her gesture was criticised by teaching representatives and by Conservative MPs Mark Spencer and George Freeman. On 12 July 2022, her portfolio was confirmed as Parliamentary Under-Secretary of State for Skills, Further and Higher Education. She was reappointed by Liz Truss.

Personal life
Jenkyns lives in Gildersome, West Yorkshire, and London; the latter for her Parliamentary duties where she lives with her husband, fellow Conservative MP Jack Lopresti, and her son, who was born in 2017 and named after her late father. She married Lopresti, the MP for Filton and Bradley Stoke in Bristol, in St Mary Undercroft in the Palace of Westminster on 22 December 2017, two years after it had been reported that she was in a relationship with him while he was still married to his first wife.

Jenkyns suffers from fibromyalgia and glossopharyngeal neuralgia which cause bouts of debilitating pain.

Jenkyns is a vegetarian and supports improvement of animal rights. She also supports keeping the ban on fox hunting. In 2015, her dogs Lady and Godiva won top prize in the Westminster Dog of the Year show.

Jenkyns is also a soprano singer.

Notes

References

External links

1974 births
21st-century British women politicians
21st-century English women singers
21st-century English singers
Living people
Alumni of the University of Lincoln
British Eurosceptics
Conservative Party (UK) MPs for English constituencies
English animal rights activists
English operatic sopranos
English women singer-songwriters
Female members of the Parliament of the United Kingdom for English constituencies
Opera crossover singers
People from Beverley
People from Lincolnshire
Politicians from Yorkshire
Singers with a four-octave vocal range
UK MPs 2015–2017
UK MPs 2017–2019
UK MPs 2019–present
Spouses of British politicians